Lick Creek Township is a township in Davis County, Iowa, USA.  As of the 2000 census, its population was 847.

History
Lick Creek Township was organized in 1846. It took its name from Lick Creek.

Geography
Lick Creek Township covers an area of 35.58 square miles (92.14 square kilometers); of this, 0.03 square miles (0.08 square kilometers) or 0.09 percent is water. The streams of Lick Creek, Little Soap Creek, Morgan Branch and North Chequest Creek run through this township.

Cities and towns
 Floris

Unincorporated towns
 Dunnville (historical)
 Pleasant View (historical)
(This list is based on USGS data and may include former settlements.)

Adjacent townships
 Keokuk Township, Wapello County (north)
 Washington Township, Wapello County (northeast)
 Salt Creek Township (east)
 Union Township (southeast)
 Perry Township (south)
 Cleveland Township (southwest)
 Soap Creek Township (west)
 Green Township, Wapello County (northwest)

Cemeteries
The township contains nine cemeteries: Dunnville, Fiedler, Jay, McCormick, Odd Fellows, Parrott, Spence, Swinney and Wilson.

Major highways
 U.S. Route 63

References
 U.S. Board on Geographic Names (GNIS)
 United States Census Bureau cartographic boundary files

External links
 US-Counties.com
 City-Data.com

Townships in Davis County, Iowa
Townships in Iowa